Francisco Jardón (29 March 1911 – 19 March 1988) was a Spanish field hockey player. He competed in the men's tournament at the 1948 Summer Olympics.

References

External links
 

1911 births
1988 deaths
Spanish male field hockey players
Olympic field hockey players of Spain
Field hockey players at the 1948 Summer Olympics
Field hockey players from Madrid